Derek Wilson (born July 19, 1982) is an American television actor. He is featured in Rectify, the Preacher TV series and is a star of the Hulu original series Future Man, in which he plays the character Wolf.

Early life and education
Wilson grew up in Bowling Green, Kentucky. He attended Western Kentucky University, choosing theater as a major after randomly pointing his finger at it on a list of options.

Wilson moved to New York City doing sound design work before performing in numerous Shakespeare plays. He would eventually graduate from the New York University Tisch School of the Arts MFA acting program.

Career
Wilson visited Los Angeles for pilot season and landed his role in Preacher.

Personal life
Wilson is a vegan. He is a fan of Louisville Cardinals men's basketball.

Filmography

Film

Television

References

External links
 
 https://livekamp.com/american-actor-derek-wilson-bio-wiki-age-height-girlfriend-net-worth/
 https://www.pastemagazine.com/articles/2017/11/why-future-man-owes-its-great-first-season-to-dere.html
 https://www.pastemagazine.com/articles/2017/12/hulu-future-man-derek-wilson-james-cameron-top-gun.html

American male television actors
Living people
1982 births